Fleseland is a small village in Lyngdal municipality in Agder county, Norway.

The total population of Fleseland is less than 20 people on a permanent basis, but during the summer holiday season the population increases as tourists rent holiday cottages in the village.

References

Villages in Agder
Lyngdal